Little Santa Anita Canyon is a canyon in the southern San Gabriel Mountains and Angeles National Forest, within Los Angeles County, southern California, 

The canyon runs south from Mount Wilson down to the town of Sierra Madre.  Little Santa Anita Creek, which flows in it, is dammed by the Sierra Madre Dam. 

The Mount Wilson Trail, a hiking trail along the western side of the canyon to the summit of Mount Wilson, has its trailhead in Sierra Madre.

See also
Santa Anita Canyon

Canyons and gorges of California
San Gabriel Mountains
Landforms of Los Angeles County, California
Angeles National Forest
Sierra Madre, California